The 2019–20 VfL Bochum season was the 82nd season in club history.

Review and events
On 26 August 2019 head coach Robin Dutt was sacked and replaced by caretaker Heiko Butscher. Butscher's tenure as caretaker ended on 6 September 2019, when the VfL Bochum announced signing Thomas Reis as head coach.

Matches

Legend

Friendly matches

2. Bundesliga

League table

Results summary

Results by round

Matches

DFB-Pokal

Squad

Squad and statistics

Squad, appearances and goals scored

|}

Transfers

Summer

In:

Out:

Winter

In:

Out:

Notes

Sources

External links
 2019–20 VfL Bochum season at Weltfussball.de 
 2019–20 VfL Bochum season at kicker.de 
 2019–20 VfL Bochum season at Fussballdaten.de 

Bochum
VfL Bochum seasons